Bouaké FC is an Ivorian football club based in the city of Bouaké. They are currently a member of the top domestic Ligue 1

Stadium
Currently the team plays at the 35,000 capacity Stade Bouaké.

Current squad

References

External links
Soccerway

Football clubs in Ivory Coast
Bouaké
Sport in Vallée du Bandama District